Hyloniscus riparius is a species of woodlouse found in Central and Eastern Europe and subsequently introduced to North America. It is strongly associated with flood plains and can tolerate periods of up to eight weeks submerged under water. In North America, it was first found at St. John's, Newfoundland in 1951, and later in New York, New Jersey, Pennsylvania and North Carolina.

References

Woodlice
Crustaceans described in 1838
Woodlice of Europe